Die Fantastischen Vier ("The Fantastic Four"), often shortened to Fanta 4, is a German hip hop band from Stuttgart. The members are Michael Schmidt (Smudo), Andreas Rieke, Thomas Dürr, and Michi Beck. They were, together with Advanced Chemistry, one of the earlier German-language rap groups.

History

In the mid-1980s, Rieke and Schmidt formed the Terminal Team, which Dürr and Beck joined in 1989. Under the new name Die Fantastischen Vier they made German hip hop, or Deutschen Sprechgesang (German spoken song) as they called it, popular in Germany. Although there were German hip-hop artists prior to them (such as Advanced Chemistry from Heidelberg), it was Die Fantastischen Vier who registered the first chart hit with their 1992 single "Die da?!" (Her?!) from the album 4 gewinnt, hitting No. 2 in Germany and No. 1 in Austria and Switzerland.

After traveling to Los Angeles in the late 1980s, the group realized the lack of connection between the struggles of "the poor blacks in the United States and middle-class whites in Germany", and made a conscious effort to move away from the typical and cliché American gangsta rap. The group never got involved with gangsta rap clichés, reacting with tongue-in-cheek humor to verbal attacks of alleged German 'gangsta rappers'. In the albums following 4 gewinnt, the band matured and progressed to a more serious and philosophic style.
In addition to the group's works, Thomas D, Hausmarke, and Ypsilon also produced successful solo albums and the four had their own weekly show Die 4. Dimension, named after their third album, which aired on the German pay TV channel Premiere in 1993 and 1994.

At the 1996 Popkomm in Cologne, Die Fantastischen Vier announced the establishment of their label, Four Music. Headquarters were in Stuttgart, but were later moved to Berlin-Kreuzberg.

Three years later, the group's seventh album 4:99 was released on their own label, with four singles from the album following. After the No. 2 hit "MfG", three singles were released at the same time, a first in German music business. Each one can be associated with one of the rappers: "Le Smou" (Smudo), "Michi Beck in Hell" (Michi Beck), and "Buenos Dias Messias" (Thomas D).

In late September 2004, the group released the album Viel, the following tour being their most successful and best-attended to date.

In 2005, Fanta 4's first greatest-hits album was published. It includes all singles, as well as several other songs and rare footage from the group's early days, when they were still called Terminal Team and rapped in English.

On 7 April 2007, the number-one album Fornika was released, preceded by the single "Ernten was wir säen" (Reap what we sow). "Ernten was wir säen" was released as a download for Guitar Hero III: Legends of Rock in December 2007 and was covered by rock band Oomph! in 2009.
Die Fantastischen Vier are also the German voices of the Penguins (Michael Beck as Skipper, Thomas D. as Kowalski, Andreas Rieke as Rico and Michael Bernd Schmidt as Private) in the Madagascar film series.

In 2010, Für dich immer noch Fanta Sie peaked again at number one of the German charts.

The 2014 release of the album Rekord marked the 25th anniversary of the band. It also topped the charts in Germany.

In 2018, the single "Zusammen", featuring Clueso, from the album Captain Fantastic, was chosen as the official song for the 2018 FIFA World Cup by German public broadcaster Das Erste.

Members

Michael "Michi" Beck – vocals, DJ
Thomas Dürr ("Thomas D") – vocals
Michael "Smudo" Schmidt – vocals
Andreas "And.Ypsilon" Rieke – electronics

Live members
Markus Kössler – bass
Florian Dauner – drums
Lillo Scrimali – keyboards
Roland Peil – percussion
Markus Birkle – guitars
ESKEI83 – DJ

Discography

Die Fantastischen Vier have released 10 studio albums, 2 compilation albums, 8 live albums, 40 singles and 3 as a featured artist. Die Fantastischen Vier have got 4 No. 1 albums in the GfK Top 100 Albums and a No. 1 single in the GfK Top 100 Singles. They have sold more than 4,7 million records, and their most successful album, 4 gewinnt, has sold more than 825 thousand units.

Albums

Studio albums

Collaborative albums

Live albums

Compilation albums

Singles

As lead artist

As featured artist

See also
 Son Goku (band)

References

External links 

  
 Four Music
 Discography at Discogs

 
German hip hop groups
Musical groups from Stuttgart